Miltochrista curtisi is a moth in the family Erebidae. It was described by Arthur Gardiner Butler in 1881. It is found on Sumatra.

References

 Arctiidae genus list at Butterflies and Moths of the World of the Natural History Museum

curtisi
Moths described in 1881
Moths of Indonesia